Shebbear, a village and civil parish in Devon, England.

Shebbear may also refer to:

 Shebbear Hundred, a former administrative diversion in Devon, England
 Shebbear College, an independent school in Devon, England
 Terowie, South Australia, previously named Shebbear